This is a list of defunct airlines of the Netherlands.

See also

 List of airlines of Netherlands
 List of defunct airlines of the Netherlands Antilles
 List of airports in Netherlands

References

Netherlands
 Defunct